The Sor is a river of southwestern Ethiopia.  A tributary of the Birbir River on its left side and joins it at latitude and longitude , the Sor rises in Sayo.

See also 
 List of rivers of Ethiopia
 Metu, Ethiopia

References

Rivers of Ethiopia
Sobat River